Maurice Symes is a former New Zealand international lawn bowler.

Bowls career

Commonwealth Games
He competed in the singles at the 1986 Commonwealth Games in Edinburgh, Scotland. Four years later he won a bronze medal for New Zealand when he was part of the pairs team at the 1990 Commonwealth Games in Auckland, New Zealand. His pairs partner was Rowan Brassey.

Asia Pacific Championships
He won three medals at the Asia Pacific Bowls Championships including a gold medal in the 1985 pairs at Tweed Heads, New South Wales.

National
He won the 1985 pairs title with Geoff Hawken at the New Zealand National Bowls Championships when bowling for the Hawera Park Bowls Club. Remarkably 36 years later he won a second national title winning the fours with John Gray, Craig MacDonell and Steve Beel.

References

Living people
New Zealand male bowls players
1945 births
Commonwealth Games medallists in lawn bowls
Commonwealth Games bronze medallists for New Zealand
Bowls players at the 1986 Commonwealth Games
Bowls players at the 1990 Commonwealth Games
20th-century New Zealand people
21st-century New Zealand people
Medallists at the 1990 Commonwealth Games